Taliang (Tariang, Talieng, Trieng) is a Bahnaric language spoken by the Jeh-Tariang people of Laos and Vietnam. It is possibly related to the Stieng language of Vietnam and Cambodia.

There are various languages that have gone by the name Taliang/Trieng, which means 'headhunters'; SEALang classifies two of these as dialects of the same language as Kasseng.

Further reading
The Institute for Cultural Research. Ministry of Information and Culture. 2003. The Life and House of the Tariang People. Sponsored by: The Japan Foundation Asia Center.

References

External links 
 http://projekt.ht.lu.se/rwaai RWAAI (Repository and Workspace for Austroasiatic Intangible Heritage)
 http://hdl.handle.net/10050/00-0000-0000-0003-903A-0@view Talieng in RWAAI Digital Archive

Bahnaric languages
Languages of Vietnam